The fifth set of Highland Council wards, 21 in number, became effective for election purposes in 2017, for the fifth general election of the Highland Council. The new wards were created under the Local Governance (Scotland) Act 2004, and are as defined in recommendations of the Local Government Boundary Commission for Scotland. The commission's report includes maps of the new wards Generally, descriptions above are inferred from the maps.

The Highland Council (Comhairle na Gaidhealtachd in  Gaelic) had become a local government authority in 1996, when the two-tier system of regions and districts was abolished and the Highland region became a unitary council area, under the Local Government etc (Scotland) Act 1994. The first Highland Council election, however, was one year earlier, in 1995. Until 1996 councillors shadowed the regional and district councils and planned for the transfer of powers and responsibilities. Elections to the council are normally on a four-year cycle, all wards being contestable at each election.

For the periods 1995 to 1999 each of 72 wards had elected one councillor by the first past the post system. For the period 1999 to 2007, each of 80 wards had elected one councillor by the same system.  In 2007, single-member, first past the post wards were replaced by 22 multi-member wards, each electing three or four councillors by the single transferable vote system, to produce a form of proportional representation.

Until 2007 each council ward had been related to one of eight council management areas. In 2007 the council decided to replace the management areas with three new corporate management areas, named as (1) Caithness, Sutherland and Easter Ross, (2) Ross, Skye and Lochaber and (3) Inverness, Nairn and Badenoch and Strathspey, and designed for those services that could not be effectively or efficiently delivered and managed at ward level. Two of these names are also those of Westminster Parliament (House of Commons) constituencies, and one name is very similar to the name of another Westminster constituency, but constituency and corporate management area boundaries are different. Each corporate management area consists of a whole number of wards.

For ward-level management purposes ten wards are stand-alone areas, eleven are merged into larger areas, and one is divided between two areas. Also, seven wards are grouped into an Inverness city management area.

They were changed further in 2017 for 74 councillors in 21 wards, 11 wards returning 4 members and 10 wards returning 3 members.

The wards are numbered as well as named.

Lists of wards created in 2017

Caithness, Sutherland and Easter Ross wards 

The Caithness, Sutherland and Easter Ross corporate management area consists of seven wards represented by 23 councillors.

Inverness, Nairn and Badenoch and Strathspey wards 

The Inverness, Nairn and Badenoch and Strathspey corporate management area consists of nine wards represented by 34 councillors. Also, seven of the wards, represented by 26 councillors, are grouped into an Inverness city management area with its own city committee.

Inverness wards

Other wards

Ross, Skye and Lochaber wards 

The Ross, Skye and Lochaber corporate management area consists of six wards represented by 23 councillors.

See also
Politics of the Highland council area

Notes and references 

Highland council wards
Administrative divisions of Scotland
Lists of wards in Scotland